Epeli Lairoti, sometimes spelled Leiroti, (born 3 June 1995) is a Fijian footballer who plays as a defender or midfielder for Fijian club Suva and the Fiji national team.

Club career
Lairoti started his career with Ba. After failing to break into the first team he moved Suva in 2015

National team
In 2017 Lairoti was called up by coach Christophe Gamel for the Fiji national football team. He made his debut on September 2, 2017, in a 0–0 draw against Indonesia. He came in for Narendra Rao in the 90th minute of play.

References

Fijian footballers
Association football defenders
Ba F.C. players
Suva F.C. players
Fiji international footballers
Living people
1995 births